RAF Marston Moor was a Royal Air Force airfield at Tockwith, North Yorkshire, during the Second World War.  It was originally called RAF Tockwith, but confusion with RAF Topcliffe led to the name change.

RAF Marston Moor was opened on 11 November 1941, the airfield and RAF Church Fenton were the closest airfields to West Yorkshire and would act as a defence should Leeds be attacked. As it happens Leeds was seldom bombed.

In 1943, Group Captain Leonard Cheshire was made the station commander. He requested to be transferred to the command of 617 Squadron in November 1943, a vacancy created by the loss of George Holden in July of that year. The move required him to voluntarily step down in rank from group captain to wing commander, which he did.

Marston Moor was also in control of RAF Rufforth and RAF Riccall.

During the war, American actor Clark Gable was stationed at the airfield before being relocated to RAF Polebrook.

Based units
During the Second World War the airfield was used by the 165 Heavy Conversion Unit (HCU) to convert pilots from the Whitley and Wellington medium bombers to piloting the four-engined Handley Page Halifax bomber. In January 1942 the unit was split into the 1652 Heavy Conversion Unit and the 1665 Heavy Conversion Unit. 1652 HCU continued in operation at Marston Moor till June 1945, while 1665 HCU moved to RAF Saltby, where it trained crews in the Halifaxes and the Short Stirling. It later moved to RAF Linton-on-Ouse.
Following the war the field was used as the home base for No. 268 Maintenance Unit RAF from 1945 to 1949.

Current use
The airfield is now known as Tockwith Airfield. The runways are used for driver's education courses. Some of the buildings about the old airfield were incorporated into a business park. The village of Tockwith has expanded onto the airfield with the eastern side and main section of one runway now dissolved by housing.
Some sources indicate civilian aviation use in the late 20th century, and probably beyond.

References

External links 

The Wartime Memories Project - RAF Marston Moor, Tockwith

Royal Air Force stations of World War II in the United Kingdom
Royal Air Force stations in Yorkshire